Transcendence, transcendent, or transcendental may refer to:

Mathematics
 Transcendental number, a number that is not the root of any polynomial with rational coefficients
 Algebraic element or transcendental element, an element of a field extension that is not the root of any polynomial with coefficients from the base field
 Transcendental function, a function which does not satisfy a polynomial equation whose coefficients are themselves polynomials
 Transcendental number theory, the branch of mathematics dealing with transcendental numbers and algebraic independence

Music
 Transcendence (Adil Omar album), a 2018 hip hop album
 Transcendence (Alice Coltrane album), a 1977 jazz album
 Transcendence (Crimson Glory album), a 1988 heavy metal album
 Transcendence (Devin Townsend Project album), a 2016 heavy metal album
 "Transcendence" (Lindsey Stirling instrumental), a 2012 instrumental piece
 "Transcendence (Segue)", a 2000 progressive metal instrumental piece by Symphony X
 Transcendental (album), a 2006 progressive metal album by To-Mera

Literature
 Transcendence (Rosenthal book), a 2011 book by Norman E. Rosenthal
 Transcendence (Salvatore novel), a 2002 fantasy novel by R. A. Salvatore
 Transcendence (Sheffield novel), a 1992 science-fiction novel by Charles Sheffield
 Transcendence: How Humans Evolved Through Fire, Language, Beauty, and Time, a 2019 book by Gaia Vince
 Transcendence: My Spiritual Experiences with Pramukh Swamiji, a 2015 book by A. P. J. Abdul Kalam and Arun Tiwari
 Transcendent (novel), a 2005 science-fiction novel by Stephen Baxter

Philosophy
 Transcendence (philosophy), climbing or going beyond some philosophical concept or limit
 Transcendentalism, a 19th-century American religious and philosophical movement that advocates that there is an ideal spiritual state that transcends the physical and empirical
 Transcendent theosophy, a school of Islamic philosophy founded by the 17th-century Persian philosopher Mulla Sadra
 Transcendental perspectivism, a philosophy blending perspectivism and transcendentalism
 Transcendental idealism, a doctrine founded by 18th-century German philosopher Immanuel Kant
 Transcendental realism, a concept put forward by Roy Bhaskar
 Transcendental arguments, a style of philosophical argumentation
 Transcendental phenomenology, a field of phenomenological inquiry developed by Edmund Husserl
 Transcendentals, religious and philosophical properties of being

Religion
 Transcendence (religion), the aspect of a god wholly independent of the material universe
 Transcendental Meditation, a meditation technique introduced by Maharishi Mahesh Yogi
 Transcendentals, religious and philosophical properties of being

Other
 Transcendence (2012 film), a Chinese film
 Transcendence (2014 film), an American film starring Johnny Depp and Morgan Freeman
 Transcendence (band), an American alternative rock band
 Transcendence (Jellum), an outdoor sculpture by Keith Jellum, in Portland, Oregon, US
 Transcendent (TV series), a 2016 American reality television series
 Transcendence (video game), a 1995 science-fiction game by George Moromisato

See also
 Transcend (disambiguation)
 Transcendental Étude (disambiguation), any of a number of compositions with this title
 Transcendental whistling, a Daoist technique of long-drawn whistling that functioned as a yogic breath exercise